Finn Fisher-Black (born 21 December 2001) is a New Zealand professional racing cyclist, who currently rides for UCI WorldTeam . He is the younger brother of fellow racing cyclist Niamh Fisher-Black.

Early life
Fisher-Black was educated at Nelson College from 2015 to 2017.

Career
Fisher-Black started the 2021 season off by defending his National Under-23 time trial title. If the elite and Under-23 results were combined Fisher-Black would've won by 9 seconds. After a crash in Le Samyn ruled him out of contention he set his sights on the Istrian Spring Trophy. Finn started strong with a 6th in the prologue and a 3rd in stage 2 however when it came to the last stage Fisher-Black was 1 second behind in the overall. His team worked hard and Fisher-Black gained enough bonus seconds at an intermediate sprint to gain the virtual lead. With his team controlling the rest if the stage Fisher-Black managed to win overall. In the 2021 Tour of Belgium Fisher-Black managed a 3rd in the Stage 3 time trial 18 seconds behind winner Remco Evenepoel he then held his fourth place in the Overall classification till the end of the race.

On 21 July 2021  announced Fisher-Black would join their team immediately and race for them through till 2024. His first race in the teams colours was Prueba Villafranca de Ordizia, where he finished 67th.

Major results

Road

2017
 National Novice Road Championships
1st  Road race
1st  Time trial
2018
 1st  Time trial, National Junior Road Championships
 2nd Time trial, Oceania Junior Road Championships
2019
 Oceania Junior Road Championships
1st  Road race
1st  Time trial
 10th Time trial, UCI Junior Road World Championships
2020
 National Under-23 Road Championships
1st  Road race
1st  Time trial
 1st  Mountains classification New Zealand Cycle Classic
2021
 1st  Time trial, National Under-23 Road Championships
 1st  Overall Istrian Spring Trophy
 2nd Overall New Zealand Cycle Classic
1st Stages 1 (TTT) & 4
 4th Overall Tour of Belgium
 4th Gravel and Tar Classic
2022
 5th Time trial, National Road Championships

Track
2018
 1st  Team pursuit, UCI Junior World Track Championships
 Oceania Track Championships
1st  Scratch race
2nd Points race
2nd Individual pursuit
2nd Team pursuit
3rd Madison
2019
 National Track Championships
2nd Team pursuit
3rd Madison

Cyclo-cross
2016
 1st  National Junior Championships

Notes

References

External links

2001 births
Living people
New Zealand male cyclists
People educated at Nelson College
Sportspeople from Nelson, New Zealand